The Pacific Games records in athletics are set by athletes who are representing one of the Pacific Games Council member federations at either the Pacific Games or the Pacific Mini Games.  Both games are quadrennial events. The  Pacific Games began as South Pacific Games in 1963, while the Pacific Mini Games began as South Pacific Mini Games in 1981.  They are held in the intervening years between the main games with a reduced sports program to allow also smaller nations to host an international sporting event.

These records based on a list published by Bob Snow on the Oceania Athletics Association webpage.

Men's records

Women's records

Records in defunct events

Men's events

Women's events

References
General
Pacific Games records 20 July 2019 updated
Specific

External links
Pacific Games Council
Oceania Athletics Association

Athletics at the Pacific Games
Athletics at the Pacific Mini Games
Pacific Games
Pacific Games